Pachydesus is a genus of beetles in the family Carabidae, containing the following species:

 Pachydesus aethiopicus Basilewsky, 1974
 Pachydesus alluaudi (Jeannel, 1913)
 Pachydesus altipeta (Jeannel, 1935)
 Pachydesus anosyanus Basilewsky, 1981
 Pachydesus bohemani (Jeannel, 1926)
 Pachydesus brincki (Basilewsky, 1958)
 Pachydesus bucculentus (Alluaud, 1933)
 Pachydesus burgeoni (Alluaud, 1933)
 Pachydesus caffer (Jeannel, 1964)
 Pachydesus celisi (Jeannel, 1955)
 Pachydesus chappuisi (Jeannel, 1935)
 Pachydesus cuccodoroi Deuve, 2005
 Pachydesus descarpentriesi Basilewsky, 1972
 Pachydesus edwardsi (Jeannel, 1940)
 Pachydesus ernei Deuve, 2005
 Pachydesus fletcheri (Jeannel, 1959)
 Pachydesus geginati Deuve, 2005
 Pachydesus gravis (Peringuey, 1899)
 Pachydesus holmi Deuve, 2005
 Pachydesus kenyensis (Jeannel, 1913)
 Pachydesus kilimanus (Jeannel, 1913)
 Pachydesus kinangopinus (Jeannel, 1935)
 Pachydesus kochi (Straneo, 1960)
 Pachydesus leleupi (Jeannel, 1960)
 Pachydesus longulus (Jeannel, 1964)
 Pachydesus marojejyanus Basilewsky, 1981
 Pachydesus ovalipennis (Jeannel, 1964)
 Pachydesus parilis (P?ringuey, 1908)
 Pachydesus parvicollis (Jeannel, 1964)
 Pachydesus pauliani (Jeannel, 1950)
 Pachydesus raffrayi (Jeannel, 1930)
 Pachydesus robustus (Alluaud, 1933)
 Pachydesus rotundatus (Jeannel, 1959)
 Pachydesus rufipes (Boheman, 1848)
 Pachydesus ruwenzoricus (Alluaud, 1933)
 Pachydesus unisetosus (Jeannel, 1935)

References

Trechinae